The Mobile Sertoma Open Invitational was a PGA Tour event that was played at the Mobile Municipal Golf Course in Mobile, Alabama in the late 1950s and the early 1960s. Today, the course is known as Azalea City Golf Course.

Winners

References

Former PGA Tour events
Golf in Alabama
Sports in Mobile, Alabama
Events in Mobile, Alabama
Recurring sporting events established in 1959
Recurring sporting events disestablished in 1962
1959 establishments in Alabama
1962 disestablishments in Alabama